The 1967 Soviet Class A Second Group was the fifth season of the Soviet Class A Second Group football competitions that was established in 1963. It was also the 27th season of the Soviet second tier league competition.

First stage

First subgroup

Number of teams by republics

Second subgroup

Number of teams by republics

Third subgroup

Number of teams by republics

Final stage

For places 1-3
 [Oct 27 – Nov 16]

Additional Final
 [Nov 21, Tashkent]
 Dinamo Kirovabad 1-0  Shakhtyor Karaganda 
 Dinamo Kirovabad promoted.

For places 4-6
 [Oct 27 – Nov 16]

See also
 Soviet First League

External links
 1967 season. RSSSF

1967
2
Soviet
Soviet